South Mill Arts  is a venue for theatre, contemporary arts and culture, local history, and conferences in Bishop's Stortford, Hertfordshire, England. One of the buildings, today Bishop's Stortford Museum, was the birthplace of Cecil Rhodes.

The complex was refurbished in 2005 and has a 300-seat theatre, a multi-purpose studio space, museum, an exhibition gallery for art and photography, and a café bar. It provides a programme of arts events and hosts professional touring productions, dance groups, musicians and comedians. Films are also shown in its tiered auditorium.

Previously called the Rhodes Arts Complex, on 24 August 2020 the arts complex was renamed South Mill Arts in response to the Black Lives Matter protests against institutional racism.

Bishop's Stortford Museum

Netteswell House, today Bishop's Stortford Museum, was the birthplace of British imperialist Cecil Rhodes, the financier and founder of diamond company De Beers who gave his name to Rhodesia. It houses the Rhodes Collection, containing interactive displays, archives, artefacts, and photographs, about the life of Rhodes. The Rhodes Birthplace Trust is a registered charity under English law.

The museum combines the collections of the former Rhodes Memorial Museum and the Bishop's Stortford Local History Museum. The Rhodes' Birthplace Museum was established in 1938 in two early-19th-century houses which are Grade II-listed buildings.  The current museum opened in 2005.

The original part of Rhodes' home holds exhibits on the life of Rhodes, 19th-century Southern African artefacts from his travels, and a reconstructed middle-class Victorian drawing room with family memorabilia.  The building holds exhibits on local history.

References

External links

 South Mill Arts - official site
 History of the Museum, Commonwealth Centre and Arts Complex on Stortford History site

Culture in Hertfordshire
Museums in Hertfordshire
Biographical museums in Hertfordshire
History museums in Hertfordshire
Grade II listed houses in Hertfordshire
Art museums and galleries in Hertfordshire
Local museums in Hertfordshire
Arts centres in England
Charities based in Hertfordshire
Bishop's Stortford
Cecil Rhodes